Tamarau is a suburb of the New Zealand city of Gisborne. It is located to the southeast of the city centre.

Demographics

Tamarau had a population of 2,367 at the 2018 New Zealand census, an increase of 123 people (5.5%) since the 2013 census, and an increase of 102 people (4.5%) since the 2006 census. There were 696 households, comprising 1,104 males and 1,263 females, giving a sex ratio of 0.87 males per female. The median age was 29.2 years (compared with 37.4 years nationally), with 687 people (29.0%) aged under 15 years, 519 (21.9%) aged 15 to 29, 927 (39.2%) aged 30 to 64, and 234 (9.9%) aged 65 or older.

Ethnicities were 36.0% European/Pākehā, 77.7% Māori, 6.2% Pacific peoples, 1.1% Asian, and 1.3% other ethnicities. People may identify with more than one ethnicity.

The percentage of people born overseas was 5.2, compared with 27.1% nationally.

Although some people chose not to answer the census's question about religious affiliation, 47.0% had no religion, 35.9% were Christian, 8.4% had Māori religious beliefs, 0.3% were Hindu and 1.4% had other religions.

Of those at least 15 years old, 183 (10.9%) people had a bachelor's or higher degree, and 417 (24.8%) people had no formal qualifications. The median income was $21,900, compared with $31,800 nationally. 75 people (4.5%) earned over $70,000 compared to 17.2% nationally. The employment status of those at least 15 was that 756 (45.0%) people were employed full-time, 240 (14.3%) were part-time, and 114 (6.8%) were unemployed.

Parks

Heath Johnston Park, located in Tamarau, is a public sports ground, one of several owned and operated by Gisborne District Council.

References

Suburbs of Gisborne, New Zealand